Washington Township is an inactive township in Clay County, in the U.S. state of Missouri.

Washington Township was erected in 1830, most likely taking its name from President George Washington.

References

Townships in Missouri
Townships in Clay County, Missouri